Fridtjof Antonius Paulsen (20 November 1895 – 28 June 1988) was a Norwegian speed skater who competed in the 1924 Winter Olympics.

He was born and died in Oslo and represented Oslo SK. In 1924 he finished fourth in the 10000 metres event and seventh in the 5000 metres competition.

External links

1895 births
1988 deaths
Sportspeople from Oslo
Norwegian male speed skaters
Olympic speed skaters of Norway
Speed skaters at the 1924 Winter Olympics